Güiria is the capital city of Valdez Municipality in the Venezuelan state of Sucre. Güiria was the place where the military campaign for South American independence set out to Upper Peru and also a starting point of the 1901 Venezuelan Civil War (Revolución Libertadora). Founded on 8 December 1767, Güiria is the state's third-largest urban centre, with a population of approximately 40,000. It is an important harbour, the only one in Venezuela located on the open Atlantic Ocean rather than on the Caribbean Sea, and the economic centre of Paria Peninsula, due to it being near the Gulf of Paria's natural gas fields, where several state and private companies have exploration projects.

Economy 

The natural gas industry has been developed in Güiria by means of the Gran Mariscal de Ayacucho Industrial Complex (CIGMA), developed by Petróleos de Venezuela (PDVSA). The project's main goal is to promote the economic and industrial growth of Sucre state and to supply natural gas also to the states of Nueva Esparta, Monagas and Anzoátegui. It is planned to be connected in later stages to the nationwide gas distribution system to supply the rest of the country and for export.

Additionally, Güiria produces coconuts, cocoa, tobacco, tubers and fish. Cattle is also raised.

Transportation 

 International Fishing Port of Güiria
 Cristóbal Colón Airport

Because Güiria is close to the island of Trinidad, there is significant maritime commerce with Trinidad and Tobago.

Popular culture 

Cricket is popular in Güiria. Steelpan music from Trinidad and Tobago can be heard in Güiria's carnival, as a cultural influence from the nearby islands.

Güiria has some typical dishes not found in usual Venezuelan cuisine, such as kalalu(callaloo), sauz (souse), pelau and domplina.

On 11 March 2012, Güiria was the landing point of the Atlantic Ocean crossing by Turkish American adventurer Erden Eruç in his Guinness world record setting solo human-powered circumnavigation of the earth, after rowing from Lüderitz, Namibia in about five months.

References 

Cities in Sucre (state)
Populated places established in 1767
Port cities and towns in Venezuela
1767 establishments in the Spanish Empire